Václav Milík Sr. (born February 23, 1960) is a former Czechoslovakian and Czech speedway rider who was started in the 1997 Speedway World Team Cup for the Czech Republic team.

His son Václav Jr. is a speedway rider also.

Career details

World Championships 
 Team World Championship Speedway World Team Cup
 1997 –  Piła – 5th placed (0 pts)

European Championships 
 European Club Champions' Cup
 2000 –  Piła – 4th placed (3 pts)

Domestic competitions 

 Team Polish Championship (League)
 1991 – Second League for Wrocław (Average 2.452)
 1992 – Second League for Wrocław B (Average 2.636)
 1992 – First League for Wrocław (Average 1.941)
 1993 – Second League for Piła (Average 2.098)
 1994 – Second League for Piła (Average 1.000)
 1996 – Second League for Łódź (Average 1.471)
 1999 – Second League for Opole (Average 2.286)
 2001 – First League for Opole (Average 0.500)

Other competitions 
 Mieczysław Połukard Criterium of Polish Speedway Leagues Aces in  Bydgoszcz
 1995 – Runner-up (12 pts)

See also 
 Czechoslovakia national speedway team
 Czech Republic national speedway team

References 

Czechoslovak speedway riders
Czech speedway riders
1960 births
Living people